Ammer Ali Seyed Mohammad Sihabdeen (born 20 December 1961) is a Sri Lankan politician, a member of the Parliament of Sri Lanka and a Deputy Minister of Rural Economic Affairs. Ameer Ali is married and has three sons.

At the 13th parliamentary elections in April 2004 he was elected to parliament as a member for Batticaloa. He served as the Non-Cabinet Minister of Disaster Relief Services from 2007 until February 2010. Sihabdeen failed to get re-elected at the subsequent parliamentary elections in 2010.

In 2012 Sihabdeen was elected to the 2nd Eastern Provincial Council, representing United People's Freedom Alliance in the Batticaloa Electoral District.

At the 15th parliamentary elections, held in August 2015, he was re-elected as a member for Batticaloa, representing the All Ceylon Makkal Congress. After his election he was appointed as the Deputy Minister of Rural Economic Affairs.

References

1961 births
Government ministers of Sri Lanka
Living people
Alumni of Zahira College, Colombo
Members of the 13th Parliament of Sri Lanka
Members of the 15th Parliament of Sri Lanka
Members of the Eastern Provincial Council
Sri Lanka Muslim Congress politicians
Sri Lankan Moor politicians
United People's Freedom Alliance politicians
Deputy ministers of Sri Lanka